Majerka  is a settlement in the administrative district of Gmina Kruklanki, within Giżycko County, Warmian-Masurian Voivodeship, in northern Poland.

This settlement did not exist before 1945.

References

Majerka